Honglingjin Park is a public park in Beijing.

The park, designated a national AAA scenic spot, lies at the junction of East 4th Ring Road and Chaoyang North Road, to the northeast of Honglingjin Bridge, about 10 kilometers from the center of the city. It is the only theme park for children named "Red scarf" in the country. It is a place for patriotic and popular science education for teenagers. The lawn surrounding the lake is dotted with trees and flowers. Major attractions are a theme square named "Song of the Red Scarf", Ginkgo Square, a children's playground, the Practical Road Safety Education Base, and several groups of artistic sculptures. Every year the park holds a scientific garden party on June 1 and a cultural festival for twins in Beijing on October 1.

Attractions
"Song of the Red Scarf" theme square: This  square lies in the west of the squares zone near the south gate of the park. At its north end stands a theme sculpture named "Song of the Red Scarf", which consists of five radial steel columns topped by a golden torch with a semicircle relief sculpture as the backdrop. On both sides of the square stand the sculptures of young revolutionary martyrs such as Lei Feng, Liu Hulan, Liu Wenxue, and 'Little Carrot', which are surrounded with flowers and green lawns.
Ginkgo Square: This  square, which lies behind the south gate, has 27 large ginkgo trees. The square is paved with terrazzo. On its east side is a  tiered flower bed that runs to  along the eastern bank of the lake.
Practical Road Safety Education Base for minor citizens: The base mainly consists of a central square, a car ground, an inner ring road and an outer one. Here learning and playing are blended. Children learn about traffic laws and regulations by driving electric cars on a simulated highway.
In the north playground there are fruit-worm gliding cars, wave cars, battery cars, a carousel, and bumper cars. In the south park there are an artificial sandlot, inflated toys, and indoor entertainment facilities. The amusement facilities are available all year round.
Steps in the Sun: These are 18 groups of artistic and educational sculptures scattered in the park.

References

Parks in Beijing